Caenby Corner is a small area in the West Lindsey district of Lincolnshire, England, at the roundabout junction of the A15 and A631 roads. Close to the village of Caenby, it is situated on what was a major Roman road known as Ermine Street leading from London to the North of England. It is in the civil parish of Glentworth.

On Caenby Corner roundabout is a filling station with shop and separate coffee shop, a private residence and the closed Moncks Arms hotel with adjacent transport cafe and lorry park. The hotel had for many years been derelict, but in 2007 there were plans to redevelop it.  Despite the re-cladding to the outside of the building, the hotel has never re-opened.

References

External links

Road junctions in England
Transport in Lincolnshire
Villages in Lincolnshire
West Lindsey District